Cabanillas del Monte is a city and a municipality which belongs to the municipality of Torrecaballeros, located in the province of Segovia, Castile and León, Spain. According to the 2022 census (INE), the locality has a population of 53 inhabitants.

Toponymy 

In 1247 it was mentioned as Cabaniellas del Monte and in the Ensenada Cadastre (1752) it was mentioned as Cabañuelas, Torrecavalleros neighborhood. The word "Cabanillas" derives from the Latin capannelas, diminutive of capanna —of possible pre-Roman origin due to the suffix -anna—, with the meaning of cabin, farm where cattle are raised or stable for the herd.

In the villages of the mountains, the houses or ranches with large corrals are still called cabins where cattle are sheared. In 1916 there was one of the few shearing yards that remained standing here, the one called Rancho de la Marquesa, which in the early 20th century maps was called Rancho de D. Tomás Mascaró. The place name is also repeated in Cabañas de Polendos and Cabanillas de Pirón (Adrada de Pirón). As for the word "Mount", it would refer to its location next to a mountain or forest.

Geography

Location 
The entrance to Cabanillas is located on the P-6121 road that connects La Granja de San Ildefonso with the N-110 in Torrecaballeros.

Limits 
It limits to the north with Espirdo and Torrecaballeros, to the south with Trescasas, to the east with the province of Madrid and to the west with Tizneros.

Fauna and Flora 
The area is mostly grasslands and abundant thorny shrubs, few specimens of shrub oak and reforestation pine forests. As aromatic species we have salsero thyme, white thyme, lavender.

Heritage 

  declared an Asset of Cultural Interest on February 6, 1997. The building dates back to the 16th century and was rebuilt in the 18th century and is now converted into a private farmhouse for celebrations.
 , a single-vaulted Romanesque building, built during the 13th century, with Renaissance additions.
 Rancho de la Marquesa, an old cabanillas enclosure and laundry located next to the Cañada Real Soriana Occidental.
 The Museo del Pastor del Agua exhibition and dissemination and research center of the traditional culture of water and linen, projected for June 2021.
 Bridge of the Five Lights over the Ciguiñuela River.
 Foal of shoeing located next to the church.
 Watering trough near the shear house.

Holidays 

 September 22, 29 and 30: Saint Michel Archangel.

References

External links 
 
 Barrios - Ayuntamiento de Torrecaballeros

Municipalities in the Province of Segovia
Populated places in the Province of Segovia